Rahmoo, officially Romu, is a small town  west of Pulwama in the Indian-administered state of Jammu and Kashmir, believed to be founded by a famous Islamic saint namely Hazrat Ruma Reshi(RA). It is one of the largest villages in the district by area and population. The village is directly administered by district administration Pulwama.

Demography 
As per the 2011 Census of India, the population of Rahmoo is 5,030, with 2,603 males and 2,427 females. 15.19% of the population is under the age of 6. In 2011, the literacy rate of Rahmoo was 39.85%, with male literacy at 47.61% and female literacy rate at 31.64%.

Education and health 

 Sheikh Ul Aalam Secondary Educational Institute(SAEI Rahmoo)
 Government Middle School
 Government Primary School
 Islamic English Medium School
 Public Health Centre
 Government Higher Secondary School

References 

Villages in Pulwama district